Višňové is a village and municipality in Revúca District in the Banská Bystrica Region of central southern Slovakia.

Geography
At December 31, 2010, it had a population of 61 citizens.

References

Villages and municipalities in Revúca District